Johan Le Bon (born 3 October 1990) is a French road bicycle racer, who currently rides for French amateur team Dinan Sport Cycling.

Career
Riding as a junior in 2008, Johan Le Bon became European Champion and World Champion within the space of a month. He also won the bronze medal at the European Time Trial Championships that year.

One year later, he joined professional cycling team . The 2010 edition of the Route bretonne gave him his first professional victory. He also won the third stage of the Coupe des nations Ville Saguenay, a race he won the previous year as an amateur, and the third stage of Kreiz Breizh Elites, becoming overall winner of the latter.

In both 2011 and 2012 Johan Le Bon emerged as French Under-23 Time Trial Champion.

In 2013 Le Bon moved to World Tour team . In the important three-day stage races of West Flanders and De Panne, Le Bon came in fifth and fourth, respectively. He gained his first podium spot with FDJ by finishing second in the Tro-Bro Léon. Later that year, Le Bon debuted in a Grand Tour when he took part in the Giro d'Italia.

In 2014, he participated in the Paris–Roubaix and Omloop Het Nieuwsblad cycling classics. He again took part in the Giro d'Italia, and also finished the Vuelta a España.

His biggest victory at the time came in 2015, when he won the fifth stage of the Eneco Tour.

Major results

2007
 1st Stage 2 Ronde des vallées
2008
 UCI Juniors World Championships
1st  Road race
5th Time trial
 UEC European Junior Road Championships
1st  Road race
3rd Time trial
 1st  Overall Ronde des vallées
1st Prologue
 1st  Overall Tour du Morbihan
 1st Classique des Alpes Juniors
 2nd Time trial, National Junior Road Championships
2009
 1st  Overall Coupe des nations Ville Saguenay
 1st Étoile de Tressignaux
 1st Stage 2 Classic Loire Atlantique
 7th Flèche Ardennaise
2010
 1st  Overall Kreiz Breizh Elites
1st Stage 3
 1st Route bretonne
 1st Stage 3 Coupe des nations Ville Saguenay
 2nd Time trial, National Under-23 Road Championships
 3rd Overall Paris–Corrèze
2011
 1st  Time trial, National Under-23 Road Championships
 1st  Mountains classification Tour de Picardie
 2nd Paris–Mantes-en-Yvelines
 5th Overall Thüringen Rundfahrt der U23
 7th Time trial, UEC European Under-23 Road Championships
2012
 1st  Time trial, National Under-23 Road Championships
 2nd Overall Thüringen Rundfahrt der U23
1st Stage 2
 4th Overall Kreiz Breizh Elites
 6th Overall Tour de Normandie
1st Young rider classification
2013
 2nd Tro-Bro Léon
 3rd Time trial, National Road Championships
 4th Overall Three Days of De Panne
 5th Overall Driedaagse van West-Vlaanderen
 5th Chrono des Nations
2014
 3rd Overall Driedaagse van West-Vlaanderen
2015
 1st Stage 5 Eneco Tour
 3rd Chrono des Nations
 8th Overall Tour de l'Eurométropole
 9th Overall Boucles de la Mayenne
1st Prologue
 9th Overall Tour du Poitou-Charentes
2016
 3rd Duo Normand (with Marc Fournier)
 4th Overall Boucles de la Mayenne
 5th Tro-Bro Léon
 5th Chrono des Nations
 10th Overall Three Days of De Panne
2017
 1st Prologue Tour de l'Ain
 2nd Overall Boucles de la Mayenne
1st Prologue & Stage 1
 2nd Polynormande
2018
 9th Ronde van Drenthe
 9th Chrono des Nations
 10th Overall Étoile de Bessèges
2020
 1st Malaysian International Classic Race
2021
 1st Stage 2 Kreiz Breizh Elites
 6th Overall Tour de Bretagne
2022
 1st  Overall Tour de Bretagne
1st Stages 2 & 7

Grand Tour general classification results timeline

References

External links
 
 

1990 births
Living people
French male cyclists
People from Lannion
Sportspeople from Côtes-d'Armor
Cyclists from Brittany